Elliot Carr Cutler Jr. (June 15, 1920 – November 27, 2006) was a United States Army officer with the rank of brigadier general. His last military service was as a head of the Electrical Engineering Department at United States Military Academy from 1961 until 1977.

Biography

Cutler was born on June 15, 1920, in Cleveland, Ohio, the son of doctor  Elliott Cutler, who would later serve as brigadier general in the Army Medical Corps during World War II. Cutler Jr. attended the United States Military Academy at West Point, New York and graduated from that institution in 1942.

Subsequently, he was commissioned a second lieutenant in the 76th Infantry Division and participated in the combats of European Theatre. For his service during the war, Cutler received a Bronze Star Medal, Purple Heart for wound and Combat Infantryman Badge.

After the war, 76th Infantry Division was disbanded at the end of the August 1945 and Cutler was transferred to the 19th Infantry Regiment of the 24th Infantry Division. He served with the regiment during Occupation of Japan as a company commander until 1950.

When the Korean War broke out, Cutler was deployed with the 24th Infantry Division during this conflict. For his participation in this war, Cutler was awarded with Legion of Merit, Oak Leaf Cluster to his Bronze Star Medal and star to his Combat Infantryman Badge.

After the war, Cutler earned his PhD in electrical engineering at Georgia Tech and subsequently served as a professor at the  United States Military Academy at West Point, New York, where he taught electrical engineering. In 1961, Cutler was appointed a head of the Electrical Engineering Department. In this capacity, Cutler championed the use of computers in the Academy's curriculum, resulting in the establishment of the Academic Computer Committee, which would bring the school into the technological age.

Cutler served in this capacity until 1977, when he retired from the army. At the retirement ceremony, he was awarded with Army Distinguished Service Medal for his military achievement and promoted to the rank of brigadier general.

Cutler died at the age of 86 at Country Center for Health & Rehabilitation in Newburyport, Massachusetts. He was married to Genevieve Cutler (néé Spalding), with whom he had son Elliott C. Cutler, III and daughter Genevieve Names.

Decorations

Here is Cutler's ribbon bar:

See also

References

1920 births
2007 deaths
United States Army generals
United States Army personnel of World War II
United States Army personnel of the Korean War
Cutler family
Recipients of the Distinguished Service Medal (US Army)
Recipients of the Legion of Merit
Military personnel from Cleveland
Georgia Tech alumni
United States Military Academy alumni
United States Military Academy faculty